Bloom is the second studio album by alternative dance group Rüfüs, released on 22 January 2016 via Sweat It Out and Sony Music Australia.

The album debuted and peaked at number one on the ARIA Albums Chart, and was later certified platinum in Australia in 2018.

Singles
The album was preceded by five singles. "You Were Right" was released as the lead single on 26 June 2015. The song peaked at number 22 on the ARIA Charts. "Like an Animal" was released on 25 September 2015, "Innerbloom" in November 2013 and "Say a Prayer for Me" in January 2014; all prior to the album's release. "Be with You" was released as the fifth and final single in July 2016.

Track listing

Personnel
Adapted from the album's liner notes.

Musicians
Rüfüs
 Tyrone Lindqvist – writing, recording, production 
 Jon George – writing, recording, production  
 James Hunt – writing, recording, production

Technical
 Rüfüs – mixing 
 Cassian Stewart-Kasimba – mixing 
 Darren Ziesing – mastering

Charts

Weekly charts

Year-end charts

Certifications

See also
 List of number-one albums of 2016 (Australia)

Notes

References

2016 albums
Rüfüs Du Sol albums